Beaufortia macrostemon, commonly known as Darling Range beaufortia, is a plant in the myrtle family, Myrtaceae and is endemic to the southwest of Western Australia. It is a low shrub with multiple stems, hairy young leaves and three stamens in each stamen bundle.

Description
It is one of the few beaufortias with a lignotuber.

The flowers are mostly red and are arranged in heads on the ends of the branches. There are 5 sepals, 5 small petals and 5 bundles of stamens. There are 3 stamens in each bundle and the free parts are bright red,  and separate at a single point.

Taxonomy and naming
Beaufortia macrostemon was first formally described in 1839 by the English botanist John Lindley in A Sketch of the Vegetation of the Swan River Colony. The specific epithet (macrostemon) is derived from the Ancient Greek makros meaning "large" or "long" and stemon meaning "thread" or "filament".

Distribution and habitat
Darling Range beaufortia usually grows in gravelly soil derived from laterite and is most common on and near the Darling Scarp in the Jarrah Forest and Swan Coastal Plain bioregions of south-western Western Australia.

Conservation
Beaufortia macrostemon is classified as "not threatened" by the Western Australian Government Department of Biodiversity, Conservation and Attractions.

References

macrostemon
Plants described in 1839
Endemic flora of Western Australia
Taxa named by John Lindley